Andrew Burnham (born 19 March 1948) is an English priest of the Roman Catholic Church. Burnham was formerly a bishop of the Church of England and served as the third Bishop of Ebbsfleet, a provincial episcopal visitor in the Province of Canterbury from 2000 to 2010. He resigned in order to be received into the Roman Catholic Church. He was ordained as a Roman Catholic priest for the Personal Ordinariate of Our Lady of Walsingham on 15 January 2011.

Early life
Burnham was born in Worksop, Nottinghamshire, received his secondary school education at Southwell Minster Grammar School, in Southwell, Nottinghamshire, and studied music at New College, Oxford. He later studied theology at New College before going on to do a Certificate of Education at Westminster College, Oxford. Following this he became Head of Music at Bilborough Grammar School in Nottingham.

Anglican ministry
Burnham trained for ordination at St Stephen's House, Oxford, although following ordination he had issues with committing to the priesthood and leaving music, a great passion of his which formed a major part of his life. He was chorus master of the Nottingham Harmonic Society from 1973 to 1985. The Bishop of Southwell therefore suggested that he become a non-stipendiary priest. However, his wife eventually persuaded him to devote himself to full-time ministry.

From 1983 to 1985, Burnham was honorary curate in Clifton in the Diocese of Southwell as a non-stipendiary priest. In 1985 he became curate at St. John the Baptist Church, Beeston, in the same diocese from 1985 until 1987. He then became vicar of the Church of St. John the Evangelist, Carrington, leaving in 1994 following his appointment as vice-principal of St Stephen's House, Oxford, a position he took up in 1995.

On 12 September 2000, Burnham was announced as the next third Bishop of Ebbsfleet, a provincial episcopal visitor (a "flying bishop") who provides episcopal oversight for parishes that reject the ministry of women who are priests. The appointment was confirmed by Letters Patent issued by Elizabeth II on 22 November 2000.

Ministry in the Roman Catholic Church

On 8 July 2008, Burnham announced his intention to lead his Anglo-Catholic parishioners into unity with the Roman Catholic Church because of disagreement about provision for those opposed to the proposed ordination of women as bishops in the Church of England. In a column in the Catholic Herald, Burnham asked Pope Benedict XVI to provide a way for his parishioners to join him in the move.

On 8 November 2010, Burnham was one of five Anglican bishops who announced their resignations and their intention to join the proposed personal ordinariate in England and Wales.  His resignation took effect on 31 December 2010.

Burnham was received into the Roman Catholic Church at a Mass at Westminster Cathedral on 1 January 2011. Also received at the same ceremony were Keith Newton (former Bishop of Richborough) and his wife, Gill, John Broadhurst (former Bishop of Fulham) and his wife, Judith, and three former sisters of the Society of Saint Margaret (Walsingham) — Carolyne Joseph, Jane Louise and Wendy Renate. On 13 January 2011, he was ordained to the diaconate with two other former Church of England bishops, John Broadhurst and Keith Newton. Two days later, on 15 January 2011, they were also ordained to the priesthood together. On this date the Personal Ordinariate of Our Lady of Walsingham in England and Wales was also officially established. On 17 March it was announced that Burnham had been appointed a Prelate of Honour by the Pope. , he is the parish priest of St Mary's Church, East Hendred, Oxfordshire.

Styles
The Reverend Andrew Burnham (1982–2000)
The Right Reverend Andrew Burnham (2000–2010)
Andrew Burnham (113 January 2011)
The Reverend Andrew Burnham (13 January 201117 March 2011)
The Reverend Monsignor Andrew Burnham (17 March 2011present)

References

1948 births
Living people
People from Worksop
Alumni of New College, Oxford
Alumni of St Stephen's House, Oxford
Bishops of Ebbsfleet
21st-century Church of England bishops
Anglo-Catholic bishops
Anglican bishop converts to Roman Catholicism
21st-century English Roman Catholic priests
Married Roman Catholic clergy
People of the personal ordinariates
English Anglo-Catholics